Peter G. Engelman, CPA, is a naturalized American writer, born in London, England, during World War II. He immigrated to the U.S. in November 1940 sailing from Liverpool to New Orleans on the Steamship Orbita. After living on a rural farm in Atoka, Oklahoma, Engelman and his parents moved to Baltimore, Maryland. Working in his father's toy and hobby store, Engelman learned about the retail business. In 1957, he graduated from Baltimore City College High School and enrolled in the University of Baltimore, where he graduated with a degree in accounting. He subsequently sat for and passed the CPA exam while working for the Internal Revenue Service as a field agent.

Mr. Engelman spent 38 years as a sole practitioner representing individual and corporate clients from various fields of endeavor including medical, real estate and manufacturing. During his active years as a CPA, he taught college and was an active participant in community affairs.

In 2001, Mr. Engelman retired from active practice to pursue a new career in writing. Since that time, he has authored and published eight books. All but one of his titles are fiction. The Minyanaires, his only non-fictional work, is a religious book that deals with Jews and their attendance at the daily minyan, a prayer meeting of ten or more persons. Mr. Engelman interviewed 25 individuals, including the clergy concerning their views on God, prayer, the soul, miracles, and other issues of faith. In the book, Engelman talks about his own spiritual journey after the death of his beloved mother.

Bibliography
Terror at the Cannery
The Minyanaires
Running From Justice: A Tale of Fugitives on the Run
Magic, Malice and Murder
Time Passport
A Moment of Passion
Why my Son?
And Time Goes By

References

1940s births
Living people
21st-century American novelists
American religious writers
University of Baltimore alumni
British emigrants to the United States
Baltimore City College alumni
People from Atoka, Oklahoma
American male novelists
21st-century American male writers
21st-century American non-fiction writers
American male non-fiction writers